Jan Maas can refer to:

 Jan Maas (cyclist, born 1900) (1900-1977), Dutch cyclist
 Jan Maas (cyclist, born 1996), Dutch cyclist
 Jan Maas (sailor) (1911-1962), Dutch sailor
 Jan Maas (animator) born 1978), German animator